The 1972 San Diego State Aztecs football team represented California State University San Diego during the 1972 NCAA University Division football season as a member of the Pacific Coast Athletic Association (PCAA).

The Aztecs were led by head coach Don Coryell, in his twelfth (and final) year, and played home games at San Diego Stadium in San Diego, California. They finished the season as conference champion, with a record of ten wins and one loss (10–1, 4–0 PCAA).

The total wins, winning percentage, and games coached are all San Diego State coaching records. He was elected to the College Football Hall of Fame in 1999 and was the first coach to win more than 100 games at both the collegiate and professional level.

After the season, Coryell left to become the head coach of the St. Louis Cardinals in the National Football League (NFL).

Schedule

Team players in the NFL
The following were selected in the 1973 NFL Draft.

The following finished their college career in 1972, were not drafted, but played in the NFL.

Team awards

Notes

References

San Diego State
San Diego State Aztecs football seasons
Big West Conference football champion seasons
San Diego State Aztecs football